= Chikodi (Rural) =

- Village
- Location in Karnataka, India Chikodi (India)
- Coordinates: 16°26′N 74°36′E
- Country: India
- State: Karnataka
- District: Belgaum

Languages
  - Official: Kannada
- Time zone: UTC+5:30 (IST)

Chikodi (Rural) is a village in Belgaum district in the southern state of Karnataka, India.
